The Grey may refer to:

 The Grey (film), a 2011 American thriller and survival film
 The Grey (Levinhurst EP)
 The Grey (Agalloch EP)
 "The Grey", a song by Lala Hsu from The Inner Me
 "The Grey", a song by Thrice from Palms
 The Grey, a restaurant
"The Grey", an episode of For All Mankind

See also
 Grey (disambiguation)